The 2009 Honda Indy Toronto was the tenth round of the 2009 IndyCar Series season and took place on July 12, 2009 at the  Exhibition Place temporary street circuit in Toronto, Ontario, Canada. Dario Franchitti won the race, to join Chip Ganassi Racing teammate Scott Dixon as the only three-time winners in the 2009 season. Franchitti also regained the points lead from Dixon, leading the championship by two points as the championship heads to Edmonton. Ryan Briscoe finished second for the fifth time in the last six races, with Penske Racing teammate Will Power third on his return to the series.

The 2009 race was a resumption of the Toronto Grand Prix after a one-year hiatus due to the unification of the Champ Car World Series into IndyCar during the 2008 season, during which a Toronto Grand Prix was not held due to scheduling conflicts.

Grid

Race

Standings after the race 

Drivers' Championship standings

References 

Honda Indy Toronto
Indy Toronto
Honda Indy Toronto
Honda Indy Toronto
Honda Indy Toronto